Benedict Michael Scharnus (December 11, 1917 - March 19, 1982) was a professional basketball player. He played for the Cleveland Rebels and the Providence Steamrollers of the Basketball Association of America (now known as the National Basketball Association).

College career
Ben played college basketball at Seton Hall University

Professional career
Ben played in 51 games for the Cleveland Rebels in the 1946–47 BAA season and one game for the Providence Steamrollers 1948–49 BAA season. In 1947, Ben was drafted by the Boston Celtics in a dispersal draft.

BAA career statistics

Regular season

Playoffs

References

External links

1917 births
1982 deaths
Cleveland Rebels players
Providence Steamrollers players
Seton Hall Pirates men's basketball players
American men's basketball players
Forwards (basketball)